Ryan Additon (born December 5, 1985) is an American umpire in Major League Baseball. After graduating from Lynn University, he pitched one season for the Kalamazoo Kings of the Frontier League.

Additon attended Western High School in Davie, Florida, and was selected by the San Francisco Giants in the 42nd round of the 2004 Major League Baseball Draft. He opted to play baseball at Lynn University, then continued his playing career with the Kalamazoo Kings of the Frontier League for the 2008 season. Additon was hired as a professional baseball umpire in 2010 and started in the Gulf Coast League. By the 2016 season, Additon had been promoted to the Triple-A level. He began working as a call-up umpire during the 2017 Major League Baseball season, making his debut on May 21, 2017, working at first base during a game Target Field. As a call-up umpire, Additon was behind home plate when Corey Kluber pitched a no-hitter on May 19, 2021. Additon was promoted to the full-time MLB staff on February 4, 2022.

Personal life
Ryan Additon's younger brother Nick was a professional baseball player in the KBO League and Chinese Professional Baseball League.

References

1985 births
Living people
Baseball pitchers
Kalamazoo Kings players
Major League Baseball umpires
Baseball players from Florida
People from Davie, Florida